Partners for Democratic Change International (PDCI) is a global partnership of Partners for Democratic Change (Partners) and the nineteen independent, local organizations partners founded in Europe, the Americas, Middle East, and Africa that work to advance civil society, good governance and a culture of change and conflict management worldwide.

Organisation

PDCI's history
Partners for Democratic Change was established in 1989. Responding initially to the monumental changes in Central and Eastern Europe, Partners established centers across Europe, the Americas, Middle East, and Africa in this way generating and supporting sustainable capacity and local competences to address governmental, business, and civil society disputes, conflicts, and change issues through mediating processes and programs.

Now it is an independent non-governmental organization. With unique specializations, the organizations share common core competencies, enabling them to train citizens, government officials, non-government activists, and business leaders through in-country and regional training initiatives, and to apply their mediating and collaborative expertise and methodologies to public disputes and issues.

As early as 1998, a next-generation network of the organizations founded by Partners for Democratic Change came into view. PDCI's early incarnations included coordination mechanisms and intra-network exchanges. In 2001, the members signed the PDCI Charter, began a tradition of meeting thrice a year and extorting contributions for a “PDCI Fund”.

The network secretariat in Brussels
In 2006 the members founded PDCI, a non-profit association under Belgian law, with a commitment to sharing their knowledge, expertise, and skills to strengthen one another, advancing their national, regional and international work, and forming an alliance that will enable others to be enriched by their peace, justice and civil society work locally.

A secretariat was established in Brussels in mid-2007.

In 2007 The Association for Conflict Resolution's International Section (ACRIS) presented Partners for Democratic Change with the Outstanding Leadership Award in 2007 in recognition of that organization's work building sustainable local capacity to advance civil society and a culture of change and conflict management worldwide. Partners for Democratic Change received the JAMS Foundation's Fourth Annual Warren Knight Award in recognition of Partners effectively managing and resolving conflict and for assisting emerging democracies throughout the world to advance a civil society.

References

Civil society
International organisations based in Belgium
Organisations based in Brussels